

0–9
 22 Vows of Ambedkar

A

 Abhayagiri Buddhist Monastery
 Abhayamudra
 Abhibhavayatana
 Abhidhajamahāraṭṭhaguru
 Abhidhamma
 Abhidhamma Pitaka
 Abhijatabhivamsa
 Abhijna
 Acala
 Acariya
 Access to Insight
 Achar (Buddhism)
 Adam's Peak
 Adhiṭṭhāna
 Adi-Buddha
 Ādittapariyāya Sutta
 Adosa
 Āgama
 Agga Maha Pandita
 Aggañña Sutta
 Aggavamsa
 Aggi-Vacchagotta Sutta
 Ahimsa
 Anne Hopkins Aitken
 Robert Baker Aitken
 Ajahn
 Ajahn Amaro
 Ajahn Brahm
 Ajahn Candasiri
 Ajahn Chah
 Ajahn Fuang Jotiko
 Ajahn Jayasāro
 Ajahn Khemadhammo
 Ajahn Lee
 Ajahn Maha Bua
 Ajahn Mun
 Ajahn Pasanno
 Ajahn Sao Kantasilo Mahathera
 Ajahn Sobin S. Namto
 Ajahn Sucitto
 Ajahn Sujato
 Ajahn Sumedho
 Ajahn Sundara
 Ajahn Suwat Suvaco
 Ajahn Thate
 Ajahn Waen Sujinno
 Ajahn Viradhammo
 Ajanta Caves
 Ajari
 Ajatasattu
 Akasagarbha
 Aksobhya
 Alayavijnana
 Alexandra David-Néel
 Alobha
 Alodawpyi Pagoda
 Aluvihare Rock Temple
 Amarapura Nikaya
 Amarapura–Rāmañña Nikāya
 Amara Sinha
 Amaravati Buddhist Monastery
 Amaravati Stupa
 Ambagahawatte Indrasabhawara Gnanasami Maha Thera
 Ambapali
 Ambedkar
 Amitabha
 Amitabha Sutra
 Amoghasiddhi
 Amoha
 Anāgāmi
 Anagarika
 Anagarika Dharmapala
 Anagarika Munindra
 Anawrahta
 Ananda
 Ananda College
 Ananda Maitreya
 Ananda Temple
 Ananda W.P. Guruge
 Anantarika-karma
 Ānāpānasati
 Ānāpānasati Sutta
 Buddhist anarchism
 Anathapindika
 Anattā
 Anattalakkhaṇa Sutta
 Reb Anderson
 Angkor Wat
 Ango
 Aṅgulimāla
 Angulimaliya Sutra
 Anguttara Nikaya
 Angya
 Anicca
 Aniconism in Buddhism
 Animals in Buddhism
 Aniruddha Mahathera
 Añjali Mudrā
 Anomadassi Buddha
 An Shigao
 Antaravasaka
 Anunatva-Apurnatva-Nirdesa
 Anupitaka
 Anupubbikathā
 Anuradhapura
 Anuruddha
 Anussati
 An Xuan
 Apadāna
 Buddhist architecture
 Arhat
 Buddhist art
 Art and architecture of Japan
 Aruna Ratanagiri Buddhist Monastery
 Arūpajhāna
 Aryadeva
 Asalha Puja
 Asaṃkhyeya
 Āsava
 Aśvaghoṣa
 Asanga
 Ascetic
 Ashin Jinarakkhita
 Ashin Nandamalabhivamsa
 Ashin Sandadika
 Ashin Thittila
 Ashoka
 Ashoka Chakra
 Ashokan Edicts in Delhi
 Asokaramaya Buddhist Temple
 Ashokavadana
 Assaji
 Asura (Buddhism)
 Atamasthana
 Āṭānāṭiya Sutta
 Atisha
 Atman (Buddhism)
 Atthakatha
  and Pārāyanavagga
 Atthasālinī
 Atumashi Monastery
 Aurangabad Caves
 Avadanasataka
 Avalokitesvara
 Avalokiteshvara of Chaiya
 Avatamsaka Sutra
 Avici
 Avijjā
 Awgatha
 Āyatana
 Ayutthaya
 Ayya Khema

B

 Bagan
 Bagaya Monastery
 Bairat Temple
 Bai Sema
 Baizhang Huaihai
 Zentatsu Richard Baker
 Bala (Buddhism)
 Bamyan Buddhas
 Balangoda Ananda Maitreya Thero
 Bangasayusang
 Bangladesh Bauddha Kristi Prachar Sangha
 Banishment of Buddhist monks from Nepal
 Bankei Yōtaku
 Baochang (monk)
 Bupaya Pagoda 
 Bardo
 Barua Buddhist Institutes in India and Bangladesh
 Basic points unifying Theravāda and Mahāyāna
 Bassui Tokushō
 Batuo
 Bauddha Rishi Mahapragya
 Joko Beck
 Bedse Caves
 Bell tower (wat)
 Bengali Buddhists
 Benhuan
 Bezeklik Thousand Buddha Caves
 Bhadda Kapilani
 Bhadda Kundalakesa
 Bhaisajyaguru
 Bhaja Caves
 Bhante
 Bhava
 Bhavacakra
 Bhavana
 Bhavanga
 Bhāvaviveka
 Bhikkhu
 Bhikkhu Analayo
 Bhikkhu Bodhi
 Bhikkhuni
 Bhumchu
 Bhumi
 Bīja
 Bimaran casket
 Bimbisara
 Birken Forest Buddhist Monastery
 Bishuddhananda Mahathera
 Bizhu
 Black Crown
 Bo Bo Gyi
 Bodh Gaya
 Bodh Gaya bombings
 Bodhgaya inscription of Mahanaman
 Bodhi
 Bodhicitta
 Bodhi Day
 Bodhidharma
 Bodhimanda
 Bodhin Kjolhede
 Bodhinyana Monastery
 Bodhipakkhiyādhammā
 Bodhiruci
 Bodhisattva
 Maitreya
 Bodhisattvacaryāvatāra
 Bodhisattva vows
 Bodhi tree
 Bodhi Vamsa
 Bojjhanga
 Bön
 Bon Festival
 Borobudur
 Borobudur bombing (1985)
 Botataung Pagoda
 Boudhanath
 Bour Kry
 Tara Brach
 Brahma (Buddhism)
 Brahmajāla Sutta
 Brahma's Net Sutra
 Brahma-viharas
 Brussels Buddha
 Budai
 Buddha
 Buddha's Birthday
 Buddhacarita
 Buddha Collapsed out of Shame
 Buddhadasa Bhikkhu
 Buddha Dharma wa Nepal Bhasa
 Buddha Dhatu Jadi
 Buddha Dordenma statue
 Buddha footprint
 Buddhaghosa
 Buddhaghosa Mahasthavir
 Buddhahood
 Buddha images in Thailand
 Buddha Jayanti Park
 Buddha-nature
 Buddhānussati
 Buddhapālita
 Buddha Sāsana Nuggaha
 Buddha statue
 Buddhavacana
 Buddhavamsa
 Buddhayaśas
 Buddhism- three branches: Theravada, Mahayana, Vajrayana
 Buddhism and Eastern religions
 Buddhism and evolution
 Buddhism and Hinduism
 Buddhism and Jainism
 Buddhism and psychology
 Buddhism and science
 Buddhism and sexual orientation
 Buddhism and sexuality
 Buddhism and the body
 Buddhism and Theosophy
 Buddhism and the Roman world
 Buddhism by region
 Buddhism in Central Asia
 Buddhism in Southeast Asia
 East Asian Buddhism
 Buddhism in the Middle East
 Buddhism in the West
 Buddhism in Africa
 Buddhism in the Americas
 Buddhism in Australia
 Buddhism in Europe
 Buddhism by country
 Buddhism in Afghanistan
 Buddhism in Argentina
 Buddhism in Australia
 Buddhism in Austria
 Buddhism in Bangladesh
 Buddhism in Belgium
 Buddhism in Belize
 Buddhism in Bhutan
 Buddhism in Brazil
 Buddhism in Brunei
 Buddhism in Bulgaria
 Buddhism in Burma
 Buddhism in Cambodia
 Buddhism in Canada
 Buddhism in China
 Buddhism in Costa Rica
 Buddhism in Croatia
 Buddhism in Czech Republic
 Buddhism in Denmark
 Buddhism in El Salvador
 Buddhism in Finland
 Buddhism in France
 Buddhism in Germany
 Buddhism in Greece
 Buddhism in Guatemala
 Buddhism in Honduras
 Buddhism in Hong Kong
 Buddhism in Iceland
 Buddhism in India
 Buddhism in Himachal Pradesh
 Buddhism in Kashmir
 Buddhism in Kerala
 Buddhism in Indonesia
 Buddhism in Iran
 Buddhism in Israel
 Buddhism in Italy
 Buddhism in Japan
 Buddhism in Korea
 Buddhism in Laos
 Buddhism in Libya
 Buddhism in Liechtenstein
 Buddhism in Malaysia
 Buddhism in Maldives
 Buddhism in Mexico
 Buddhism in Mongolia
 Buddhism in Morocco
 Buddhism in Nepal
 Buddhism in the Netherlands
 Buddhism in New Zealand
 Buddhism in Nicaragua
 Buddhism in Norway
 Buddhism in Pakistan
 Buddhism in Panama
 Buddhism in the Philippines
 Buddhism in Poland
 Buddhism in Reunion
 Buddhism in Russia
Buddhism in Kalmykia
 Buddhism in Saudi Arabia
 Buddhism in Senegal
 Buddhism in Singapore
 Buddhism in Spain
 Buddhism in Slovakia
 Buddhism in Slovenia
 Buddhism in South Africa
 Buddhism in Sri Lanka
 Buddhism in Sweden
 Buddhism in Switzerland
 Buddhism in Taiwan
 Buddhism in Thailand
 Buddhism in Ukraine
 Buddhism in the United Kingdom
 Buddhism in England
 Buddhism in Scotland
 Buddhism in Wales
 Buddhism in the United States
 Buddhism in Venezuela
 Buddhism in Vietnam
 Buddhism in the West
 Buddhist atomism
 Buddhist art
 Sacred art
 Greco-Buddhist Art
 Buddhist caves in India
 Buddhist clergy
 Buddhist cosmology
 Buddhist Councils
 First Buddhist council
 Second Buddhist council
 Third Buddhist council
 Fourth Buddhist council
 Fifth Buddhist council
 Sixth Buddhist council
 Buddhist cuisine
 Buddhist Cultural Centre
 Buddhist economics
 Buddhist eschatology
 Buddhist ethics
 Buddhist flag
 Buddhist Hybrid English
 Buddhist Hybrid Sanskrit
 Buddhist Institute (Cambodia)
 Buddhist kingship
 Buddhist Maha Vihara, Brickfields
 Buddhist music
 Buddhist orders
 Buddhist paths to liberation
 Buddhist Peace Fellowship
 Buddhist philosophy
 Buddhist pilgrimage sites in Nepal
 Buddhist Publication Society
 Buddhist socialism
 Buddhist symbolism
 Buddhist terms and concepts
 Buddhist texts
 Buddhist views of homosexuality
 Buddhist views on sin
 Buddhology
 Bulguksa
 Buner reliefs
 Burmese Buddhist Temple (Singapore)
 Burmese Buddhist titles
 Burmese pagoda
 Busabok
 Byōdō-in

C

 Caitika
 Cakrasaṃvara Tantra
 Buddhist calendar
 Cāmadevivaṃsa
 Candi of Indonesia
 Candi Bahal
 Candi Banyunibo
 Candi Bubrah
 Candi Jabung
 Candi Kalibening
 Candi Lumbung
 Candi Mendut
 Candi Ngawen
 Candi Pawon
 Candi Plaosan
 Candi Sari
 Candi Sewu
 Candi Sojiwan
 Candrakīrti
 Candraprabha
 Caodong school
 Cariyapitaka
 Shaila Catherine
 Cetiya
 Chagdud Tulku Rinpoche
 Chaitya
 Chaitya Bhoomi
 Chak Phra
 Champasak Sangha College
 Chan
 Chandra Khonnokyoong
 Chan Khong
 Chanmyay Sayadaw
 Channa
 Chanting
 Charumati Stupa
 Sherry Chayat
 Chedi Phukhao Thong
 Cheng Yen
 Cheontae
 Chi Chern
 Chinese Buddhism 
 Chinese Buddhist canon
 Chinese Esoteric Buddhism 
 Chithurst Buddhist Monastery
 Chittadhar Hridaya
 Chittagong Pali College
 Chofa
 Chögyam Trungpa
 Chorten
 Chotrul Duchen
 Buddhist influences on Christianity
 Buddhism and Christianity
 Chuon Nath
 Citta
 Citta (disciple)
 Cittasubho
 Clinging
 Commentaries
 Compassion
 Concentration
 Conceptual Proliferation
 Consciousness
 Consciousness-only
 Contact
 Contemplation Sutra
 Edward Conze
 Craving
 John Crook (ethologist)
 Buddhist cuisine
 Culavamsa
 Cultural elements of Buddhism
 Culture of Bhutan
 Culture of Myanmar
 Cunda

D

 Dagpo Kagyu
 Dahui Zonggao
 Dai Bai Zan Cho Bo Zen Ji
 Dainin Katagiri
 Dakini
 Dalai Lama
 1st Dalai Lama
 2nd Dalai Lama
 3rd Dalai Lama
 4th Dalai Lama
 5th Dalai Lama
 6th Dalai Lama
 7th Dalai Lama
 8th Dalai Lama
 9th Dalai Lama
 10th Dalai Lama
 11th Dalai Lama
 12th Dalai Lama
 13th Dalai Lama
 14th Dalai Lama
 Dalit Buddhist movement
 Daman Hongren
 Dambulla cave temple
 Dāna
 Danka system
 Daoji
 Daoxuan
 Daranagama Kusaladhamma Thero
 Dasabodhisattuppattikatha
 Dasa sil mata
 Das Buddhistische Haus
 Dashabhumika
 Dāṭhavaṃsa
 Davuldena Gnanissara Thero
 Daw Mya Thwin
 Dayi Daoxin
 Dazu Huike
 Death
 Decline of Buddhism in India
 Deekshabhoomi
 Defilements
 Delgamuwa Raja Maha Vihara
 Ruth Denison
 Dependent Origination
 Depictions of Gautama Buddha in film
 Deva
 Devadaha
 Devadatta
 Devanampiya Tissa of Anuradhapura
 Development of Karma in Buddhism
 Devotion
 Dhamek Stupa
 Dhammacakkappavattana Sutta
 Dhammachakra Pravartan Day
 K.L. Dhammajoti
 Dhamma Joti Vipassana Meditation Center
 Dhammakaya meditation
 Dhammakaya Movement
 Dhammakaya Tradition UK
 U Dhammaloka
 Dhammalok Mahasthavir
 K. Sri Dhammananda
 Dhammananda Bhikkhuni
 Dhammapada
 Dhammapāla
 Dhammarakkhita
 Dhammasangani
 Dhammasattha
 The Dhamma Brothers
 Dhamma Society Fund
 Dhamma vicaya
 Dhammayangyi Temple
 Dhammayazika Pagoda
 Dhammayietra
 Dhammayuttika Nikaya
 Dhammazedi
 Dhammika Sutta
 Dhammikarama Burmese Temple
 Dharani
 Dhardo Rimpoche
 Dharma/Dhamma
 Dharmacakra
 Dharmachari Guruma
 Dharma character school
 Dharmadhatu
 Dharmaditya Dharmacharya
 Dharmaguptaka
 Dharmakaya
 Dharmakirti
 Dharmakīrtiśrī
 Dharmakṣema
 Dharmapala
 Dharmaraja College
 Dharmarajika Stupa
 Dharmarakṣa
 Dharmaraksita
 Dharma Seed
 Dharmaskandha
 Dharma centre
 Dharma talk
 Dharma transmission
 Dharmodaya
 Dhatu
 Dhatukatha
 Dhatukaya
 Dhauli
 Dhṛtarāṣṭra
 Dhutanga
 Dhyānabhadra
 Dhyāna in Buddhism
 Diamond Realm
 Diamond Sutra
 Diamond Way Buddhism
 Dighajanu Sutta
 Digha Nikaya
 Dignāga
 Dipa Ma
 Dipankara
 Dīpavaṃsa
 Dirgha Agama
 Disciple or Hearer
 Divyavadana
 Diyawadana Nilame
 Dōgen
 Doing Time, Doing Vipassana
 Dōkyō
 Dolpopa Sherab Gyaltsen
 Dona Sutta
 Donchee
 Dongshan Liangjie
 Issan Dorsey
 Drikung Kagyu
 Drukpa Lineage
 Drupka Teshi
 Dudjom Rinpoche
 Dukkha
 Dzogchen

E

 Early Buddhist schools
 Early Buddhist texts
 East Asian Buddhism
 Edicts of Ashoka
 Effort
 Eido Tai Shimano
 Eight auspicious symbols
 Eight Garudhammas
 Eindawya Pagoda
 Eisai
 Ekaggata
 Ekayana Monastery bombing (2013)
 Ekavyahāraka
 Ekottara Āgama
 Ellora Caves
 Mount Emei
 Emerald Buddha
 Emptiness
 Engaku-ji
 Energy
 Engaged Buddhism
 Equanimity
 Esala Mangallaya
 Esala Perahera
 Buddhist eschatology
 Eternal Buddha
 Buddhist ethics
 Buddhist Ethics (discipline)

F

 Faith in Buddhism
 Family of Gautama Buddha
 Faxian
 Fayun
 Fazang
 Feeling
 Festival of Floral Offerings
 Filial piety in Buddhism
 Fire Sermon
 Zoketsu Norman Fischer
 Five Aggregates
 Five Hindrances
 Five Precepts
 Five Spiritual Faculties
 Five Strengths
 Five Wisdom Buddhas
 Five Wisdoms
 Fo Guang Shan
 Fo Guang Shan Buddha Museum
 Foguang Temple (Mangshi)
 Footprint of the Buddha
 James Ishmael Ford
 Forest Tradition of Ajahn Chah
 Form
 Formations
 Fotudeng
 Four Buddhist Persecutions in China
 Four Dharmadhātu
 Four Divine Abidings
 Four Great Elements
 Four Heavenly Kings
 Four Noble Truths
 Four Right Exertions
 Four sights
 Four stages of enlightenment
 Fourteen unanswerable questions
 Friends of the Western Buddhist Order
 Gil Fronsdal
 Fuju-fuse
 Fuke Zen

G

 Gadaw
 Gawdawpalin Temple
 Gal Vihara
 Gampopa
 Gandhara
 Gandharan Buddhism
 Gandharan Buddhist texts
 Gandharva
 Ganden Tripa
 Gangaramaya Temple
 Garab Dorje
 Gatbawi
 Gautama Buddha
 Gautama Buddha in world religions
 Gavāṃpati
 Gaya
 Gelukpa
 Gempo Yamamoto
 Generosity
 Geshe
 Geumdong Mireuk Bosal Bangasang
 Gihwa
 Girihandu Seya
 Tetsugen Bernard Glassman
 Global Buddhist Network
 Global Vipassana Pagoda
 Glossary of Buddhism
 Gnosticism and Buddhism
 God in Buddhism
 S. N. Goenka
 Golden Buddha (statue)
 Golden Light Sutra
 Golden Pagoda, Namsai
 Joseph Goldstein (writer)
 Golulaka
 Gradual training
 Great Buddha (Bodh Gaya)
 Great Buddha of Thailand
 Great Tang Records on the Western Regions
 Greco-Buddhism
 Greco-Buddhist art
 Greco-Buddhist monasticism
 Guan Yin
 Guang Qin
 Gubyaukgyi Temple (Myinkaba)
 Guntupalli Group of Buddhist Monuments

H

 Hachiman
 Haeinsa
 Haibutsu kishaku
 Hajime Nakamura
 Hakuin Ekaku
 Haku'un Yasutani
 Ryushin Paul Haller
 Hall of Four Heavenly Kings
 Hall of Guanyin
 Hall of Guru
 Hall of Kshitigarbha
 Hall of Sangharama Palace
 Hamsa
 Han Yong-un
 Happiness
 Harada Daiun Sogaku
 Hariti
 Hatadage
 Hatthaka of Alavi
 Heart Sutra
 Heaven
 Hell
 Henepola Gunaratana
 Heng Sure
 Hermann Hesse
 Higher evolution
 Hikkaduwe Sri Sumangala Thera
 Hinayana
 Hiranya Varna Mahavihar
 History of Buddhism
 History of Buddhism in Cambodia
 History of Buddhism in India
 History of Buddhism in India and Tibet
 History of the Thai Forest Tradition
 Hngettwin Nikaya
 Buddhist holidays
 Hōnen
 Hong Choon
 Hong Yi
 Honpa Hongwanji Mission of Hawaii
 Ho trai
 Houn Jiyu-Kennett
 Householder
 Hsinbyume Pagoda
 Hsi Lai Temple
 Hsing Yun
 Hsuan Hua
 Hsu Yun
 Htilin Monastery
 Htilominlo Temple
 Htupayon Pagoda
 Huangbo Xiyun
 Huayan school
 Cheri Huber
 Huichang Persecution of Buddhism
 Dajian Huineng
 Human beings in Buddhism
 Humanistic Buddhism
 Christmas Humphreys
 Hungry ghost
 Huot Tat
 Hwaom
 Hyecho

I

 Icchantika
 I Ching (monk)
 Iconography of Gautama Buddha in Laos and Thailand
 Iddhi
 Iddhipada
 Ignorance
 Daisaku Ikeda
 Ikkō-shū
 Ikkyū
 Imakita Kosen
 Impermanence
 Indonesian Esoteric Buddhism
 Indrasala Cave
 Indriya
 Infinite Life Sutra
 Ingen
 Innumerable Meanings Sutra
 Insight
 Insight Meditation Society
 International Buddhist College
 International Buddhist Studies College
 International Congress on Buddhist Women's Role in the Sangha
 International Meditation Centre
 International Theravada Buddhist Missionary University
 Ippen
 Itivuttaka

J

 Jai Bhim
 Jainism and Buddhism
 Jakuen
 Jakushitsu Genkō
 Jakusho Kwong
 Jamgon Kongtrul
 Jana Baha Dyah Jatra
 Jana bahal
 
 Jataka tales
 Jāti (Buddhism)
 Jaya Sri Maha Bodhi
 Jetavana
 Jetavanaramaya
 Jetsundamba
 Jhāna
 Jianzhi Sengcan
 Jinakalamali
 Jinapañjara
 Jinul
 Jisha
 Mount Jiuhua
 Jizang
 Jnanagupta
 Jnanaprasthana
 Jnanasutra
 Jnanayasas
 Jodo Shinshu
 Jōdo shū
 John Garrie
 Jokhang
 Jonang
 Jukai

K

 Kaba Aye Pagoda
 Kadampa
 Kadawedduwe Jinavamsa Mahathera
 Kagyu
 Kaichō
 Mount Kailash
 Kakusandha
 Kalachakra
 Kalama Sutta
 Kalpa (aeon)
 David Kalupahana
 Kalu Rinpoche
 Kalyāṇa-mittatā
 Kalyani Inscriptions
 Kalyani Ordination Hall
 Kāma
 Kamalapur Dharmarajika Bauddha Vihara
 Kamalaśīla
 Kammapatha
 
 Kandahar Bilingual Rock Inscription
 Kandahar Greek Edicts of Ashoka
 Kandy Esala Perahera
 Kangan Giin
 Kang Senghui
 Kangyur
 Kanheri Caves
 Kanishka
 Kanishka casket
 Kanishka Stupa
 Kanthaka
 Kapilavatthu
 Philip Kapleau
 Kappiya
 Kargah Buddha
 Karla Caves
 Karma in Buddhism
 Karma in Tibetan Buddhism
 Karma Kagyu
 Karmapa
 1st Karmapa (Düsum Khyenpa)
 2nd Karmapa (Karma Pakshi)
 3rd Karmapa (Rangjung Dorje)
 4th Karmapa (Rolpe Dorje)
 5th Karmapa (Deshin Shekpa)
 6th Karmapa (Thongwa Dönden)
 7th Karmapa (Chödrak Gyatso)
 8th Karmapa (Mikyö Dorje)
 9th Karmapa (Wangchuk Dorje)
 10th Karmapa (Chöying Dorje)
 11th Karmapa (Yeshe Dorje)
 12th Karmapa (Changchub Dorje)
 13th Karmapa (Dudul Dorje)
 14th Karmapa (Thekchok Dorje)
 15th Karmapa (Khakyab Dorje)
 16th Karmapa (Rangjung Rigpe Dorje)
 Karma Thinley Rinpoche
 Karuṇā
 Kasaya (clothing)
 Kasina
 Kassapa Buddha
 Kāśyapīya
 Kathavatthu
 Kathina
 Kaunghmudaw Pagoda
 Kāyagatāsati Sutta
 Kegon
 Keido Fukushima
 Keiji Nishitani
 Keisaku
 Keizan
 Kek Lok Si
 Kelaniya Raja Maha Vihara
 Kensho
 Kesariya
 Kevatta Sutta
 Khaggavisana Sutta
 Khakkhara
 Khandha
 Khandhaka
 Khanti
 Khatha
 Khema
 Khenpo
 Khmer Empire
 Khuddaka Nikaya
 Khuddakapatha
 Khujjuttarā
 Kilesa
 Kimbell seated Bodhisattva
 Kindo Baha
 Kinhin
 Kiribathgoda Gnanananda Thero
 Kiri Vehera
 Kisa Gotami
 Kishimojin
 Kitaro Nishida
 Knowing Buddha
 Koan
 Kodo Sawaki
 Koṇāgamana
 Kondañña
 Korawakgala
 Korean Buddhist sculpture
 Korean Buddhist temples
 Jack Kornfield
 Kosambi
 Kothduwa temple
 Kotmale Mahaweli Maha Seya
 Kotugoda Dhammawasa Thero
 Kripasaran Mahathera
 Ksitigarbha
 Ksudraka Agama
 Kūkai
 Kumārajīva
 Kumar Kashyap Mahasthavir
 Kundaung
 Kunjed Gyalpo Tantra
 Kurjey Lhakhang
 Kushinagar
 Kuthodaw Pagoda
 Kyaikhtisaung Pagoda
 Kyaikkhauk Pagoda
 Kyaiktiyo Pagoda
 Kyaung
 Kyaukse elephant dance festival
 Kyauktawgyi Buddha Temple (Mandalay)
 Kyauktawgyi Buddha Temple (Yangon)
 Kyichu Lhakhang
 Kyoto
 Kyōzō

L

 Laykyun Sekkya
 Lalitavistara Sutra
 Lama
 Lamrim Yeshe Nyingpo
 Lankarama
 Lankavatara Sutra
 Lao Buddhist sculpture
 Hugo Enomiya-Lassalle
 Lawkananda Pagoda
 Lay follower
 Ledi Sayadaw
 Lhabab Duchen
 Liangqing (monk)
 Liberation Rite of Water and Land
 Life release
 Lineage
 Linji school 
 Linji Yixuan
 Lion Capital of Ashoka
 List of Bodhisattvas
 List of Buddha claimants
 List of Buddhas
 List of Buddhist temples
 List of Buddhist temples in Japan
 List of Buddhist temples in Kyoto
 List of Buddhist temples in Thailand
 List of Buddhist temples in Myanmar 
 List of Buddhist temples in Cambodia
 List of Buddhist temples in the United States
 List of Buddhist temples in Singapore
 List of Buddhist temples in Canada
 List of Buddhist temples in Malaysia
 List of Buddhist temples in Indonesia
 List of Buddhist temples in India
 List of Buddhist temples in Bhutan
 List of Buddhist temples in Mongolia
 List of Buddhist temples in Bangladesh
 List of Buddhists
 List of American Buddhists
 List of Korean Buddhists
 List of Marathi Buddhists
 List of Rinzai Buddhists
 List of converts to Buddhism
 List of converts to Buddhism from Christianity
 List of converts to Buddhism from Hinduism
 List of Edicts of Ashoka
 List of Mahaviharas of Newar Buddhism
 List of monasteries in Nepal
 List of places where Gautama Buddha stayed
 List of Sāsana Azani recipients
 List of stupas in Nepal
 List of suttas
 List of the twenty-eight Buddhas
 Lobsang Palden Yeshe
 Lobsang Yeshe
 Buddhist logic
 Lohicca Sutta
 Lokaksema (Buddhist monk)
 Lokesvararaja
 Lokuttaravada
 Longchenpa
 Longmen Grottoes
 John Daido Loori
 Lord Buddha TV
 Loriyan Tangai
 Lotus Sutra
 Loving-kindness
 Luang Phor Phet
 Luangpho Yai
 Luang Por
 Luang Por Dattajivo
 Luang Por Dhammajayo
 Luang Por Khun Parissuddho
 Luangpor Thong
 Luang Prabang
 Luang Pu Sodh Candasaro
 Luang Pu Thuat
 Luang Pu Waen Suciṇṇo
 Luipa
 Lumbini
 Lumbini Buddhist University
 Lumbini Development Trust
 Lumbini Natural Park
 Lumbini pillar inscription
 Luminous mind

M

 Madhu Purnima
 Madhyama Āgama
 Mādhyamaka
 Madihe Pannaseeha Thero
 Maechi
 Magha Puja
 Maha Aungmye Bonzan Monastery
 Mahābhūta
 Maha Bodhi Tahtaung
 Mahabodhi Temple
 Mahabodhi Temple, Bagan
 Mahachulalongkornrajavidyalaya University
 Mahadeva
 Mahadharmaraksita
 Mahādvāra Nikāya
 Mahagandhayon Monastery
 Maha Ghosananda
 Maha Kapphina
 Mahakassapa
 Mahamakut Buddhist University
 Mahamoggallāna
 Mahamudra
 Mahamuni Buddha
 Mahanayaka
 Maha Nikaya
 Mahanipata Jataka
 Mahapajapati Gotami
 Mahaparinibbana Sutta
 Mahaparinirvana
 Mahasamghika
 Mahasantisukha Buddha Sasana Center
 Mahasati Meditation
 Mahāsatipaṭṭhāna Sutta
 Mahasiddha
 Mahasi Sayadaw
 Mahasthabir Nikaya
 Mahasthamaprapta
 Mahavamsa
 Mahāvastu
 Mahavihara
 Mahayana
 Mahayana Mahaparinirvana Sutra
 Mahayana sutras
 Mahinda
 Mahinda College
 Mahindarama Buddhist Temple
 Mahisasaka
 Mahiyangana Raja Maha Vihara
 Maitreya
 Majjhantika
 Majjhima Nikaya
 Major Pillar Edicts
 Major Rock Edicts
 Makyo
 Mala
 Manas
 Mandala
 Mandala of the Two Realms
 Mandalay Hill
 Mandarava
 Mangala Sutta
 Mani stone
 Manjusri
 Mañjuśrīmitra
 Mantra
 Manuha Temple
 Mapalagama Wipulasara Maha Thera
 Mara (demon)
 Marathi Buddhists
 Marananta
 Maravijaya attitude
 Marpa Lotsawa
 Buddhist view of marriage
 Masoyein Monastery
 Matter
 Mathura lion capital
 Mawtinzun Pagoda
 Maya
 Maya Devi Temple, Lumbini
 Maya (illusion)
 Mazu Daoyi
 Medawi
 Medhankara
 Medicine Buddha
 Medirigiriya Vatadage
 Meditation
 Meditation attitude
 Menander I
 Merit
 Mes Aynak
 Mettā
 Metta Sutta
 Middle Way
 Midwest Buddhist Temple Ginza Holiday Festival
 Migettuwatte Gunananda Thera
 Mihintale
 Mikkyō
 Milarepa
 Milinda Pañha
 Mind
 Mindfulness (Buddhism)
 Mindstream
 Mingalaba
 Mingalazedi Pagoda
 Mingun Sayadaw
 Minor Rock Edicts
 Miracles of Gautama Buddha
 Mirisawetiya Vihara
 Mogao Caves
 Moggaliputta-Tissa
 Moheyan
 Monastic education
 Monastic examinations
 Monastic robe (Tricivara)
 Antaravasaka
 Uttarasanga
 Sangati
 Monastic schools in Myanmar
 Buddhist monasticism
 Mondop
 Mondo (scripture)
 Monk
 Monkey mind
 Morality
 Mouzi Lihuolun
 Muaro Jambi Temple Compounds
 Mucalinda
 Mudita
 Mudra
 Muho Noelke
 Mūlapariyāya Sutta
 Mulian Rescues His Mother
 Muragala
 Buddhist music
 Musō Soseki
 Muyan
 Myadaung Monastery
 Myōe

N

 Naga Prok attitude
 Nāgārjuna
 Nāgasena
 Nagayon Pagoda
 Nairatmya
 Nakahara Nantenbo
 Nalanda
 Namarupa
 Namtso
 Namu Myōhō Renge Kyō
 Nanhai Jigui Neifa Zhuan
 Ñāṇamoli Bhikkhu
 Ñāṇavīra Thera
 Nanda (half-brother of Buddha)
 Nanda (Buddhist nun)
 Nara, Nara
 Naraka
 Naropa
 Naropa University
 Nasik Caves
 Navayana
 Nekkhamma
 Nenang Pawo
 Neo-Buddhism
 Nettipakarana
 Newar Buddhism
 Ngagpa
 Ngahtatgyi Buddha Temple
 Nianfo
 Nibbana
 Nichiren
 Nichiren Buddhism
 Nichiren Shōshū
 Nichiren-shū
 Niddesa
 Nikāya
 Nikaya Buddhism
 Nikkō (priest)
 Nīlakaṇṭha Dhāraṇī
 Nio protectors
 Nipponzan-Myōhōji
 Nirvana
 Nissarana Vanaya
 Niyama
 Noble Eightfold Path
 Non-returner
 Non-self
 Novice monk
 Novice nun
 Nubchen Sangye Yeshe
 Nun
 Nung Chan Monastery
 Nyanaponika Thera
 Nyanatiloka Mahathera
 Nyingma
 Nyingmapa
 Nyogen Senzaki

O

 Ōbaku
 Oda Sesso
 Offering (Buddhism)
 Henry Steel Olcott
 Old age
 Ole Nydahl
 Om
 Om mani padme hum
 Once-returner
 Ordination hall
 Ōryōki
 Outline of Buddhism

P

 Pa-Auk Forest Monastery
 Pa-Auk Sayadaw
 Pabbajjā
 Padmasambhava
 Padumuttara Buddha
 Pagoda
 Pagoda festival
 Pakhannge Monastery
 Pak Ou Caves
 Pāli
 Pāli Canon
 Pali literature
 Pali Text Society
 Panadura
 Pancasila
 Panchen Lama
 1st Panchen Lama (Khedrup Gelek Pelzang)
 2nd Panchen Lama (Sönam Choklang)
 3rd Panchen Lama (Ensapa Lobsang Döndrup)
 4th Panchen Lama (Lobsang Chökyi Gyaltsen)
 5th Panchen Lama (Lobsang Yeshe)
 6th Panchen Lama (Lobsang Palden Yeshe)
 7th Panchen Lama (Palden Tenpai Nyima)
 8th Panchen Lama (Tenpai Wangchuk)
 9th Panchen Lama (Thubten Choekyi Nyima)
 10th Panchen Lama (Choekyi Gyaltsen)
 11th Panchen Lama (Gedhun Choekyi Nyima)
 11th Panchen Lama (Gyaincain Norbu)
 Pancika
 Paññā
 Paññāsa Jātaka
 Papañca
 Parable of the Poisoned Arrow
 Paracanonical texts (Theravada Buddhism)
 Paramartha
 Paramita
 Parinibbana (Parinirvana)
 Parinibbana of Mahamoggallana
 Paritta
 Parivara
 Pariyatti
 Pariyatti (bookstore)
 Parwati Soepangat
 Pasenadi
 Passaddhi
 Paticcasamuppāda
 Patience
 Patikulamanasikara
 Pāṭimokkha
 Patisambhidamagga
 Patna
 Paṭṭhāna
 Paubha
 Pāvā
 Pavarana
 Pawo
 Payathonzu Temple
 Peace Revolution
 Perception
 Perfect Enlightenment Sutra
 Perfection of Wisdom
 Perfection of Wisdom School
 Persecution of Buddhists
 Peta
 Petakopadesa
 Petavatthu
 Phassa
 Pha That Luang
 Phaung Daw U Pagoda
 Buddhist philosophy
 Phra Bang
 Phra Mae Thorani
 Phra Mahathat Kaen Nakhon
 Phra Malai Kham Luang
 Phra Pathom Chedi
 Phra Phuttha Sihing
 Phra That Kham Kaen
 Phuket Big Buddha
 Phurba
 Phutthamonthon
 Physical characteristics of the Buddha
 Buddhist pilgrimage
 Pillars of Ashoka
 Pindaya Caves
 Pindola Bharadvaja
 Pirivena
 Pitalkhora Caves
 Pīti
 Piyadasi
 Piyadassi Maha Thera
 Platform Sutra
 Buddhist poetry
 Polonnaruwa Vatadage
 Polwatte Buddhadatta Thera
 Post-canonical Buddhist texts
 Potala Palace
 Poya
 Poy Sang Long
 Prabashvara
 Pragyananda Mahasthavir
 Prahevajra
 Prajna
 Prajna (Buddhist Monk)
 Prajnananda Mahathera
 Prajnaparamita
 Prajnaparamita of Java
 Prajnaptisastra
 Prajñaptivāda
 Prakaranapada
 Prakrit
 Pranidhipurna Mahavihar
 Prasaṅgika
 Prasat (Thai architecture)
 Pratimoksha
 Pratītyasamutpāda
 Pratyekabuddha
 Buddhist prayer beads
 Prayer wheel
 Preah Maha Ghosananda
 Precept, Samadhi, Enlightenment
 Pre-sectarian Buddhism
 Prince Sattva
 Proliferation
 Prostration
 Pudgalavāda
 Puggalapannatti
 Puja
 Puṇṇa Mantānīputta
 Pure Abodes
 Pure land
 Pure Land Buddhism
 Purisa
 Purity in Buddhism
 Mount Putuo
 Pyatthat
 Pyrrhonism

Q
 Queen Maya

R

 Rāhula
 Rainbow body
 Rajagaha
 Rajguru Aggavamsa Mahathera
 Rajguru Priyo Ratana Mahathera
 Ramagrama stupa
 Rāmañña Nikāya
 Ramifications of the Buddha concept
 Rangjung Rigpe Dorje
 Ratana Sutta
 Ratmalane Sri Dharmaloka Thera
 Ratnasambhava
 Reality in Buddhism
 Rebirth (Buddhism)
 Refuge (Buddhism)
 Reincarnation
 Relics associated with Buddha
 Relics of Sariputta and Moggallana
 Relic of the tooth of the Buddha
 Rennyo
 Renunciation
 Ridi Viharaya
 Rime movement
 Rhinoceros Sutra
 Rinpoche
 Rinzai
 Rōben
 Robert Baker Aitken
 Rohatsu
 Rohini (Buddha's disciple)
 Rōshi
 Sevan Ross
 Rumtek
 Rūpa
 Ruwanwelisaya
 Ryōkan

S

 Sacca
 Sacca-kiriyā
 Sacred Mountains of China
 Saddha
 Sagaing
 Saichō
 Sakadagami
 Śakra (Buddhism)
 Sakyapa
 Sakya Pandita
 Sala kan parian
 
 Salin Monastery
 Sharon Salzberg
 Samadhi
 Samanera
 Samaneri
 Samaññaphala Sutta
 Samantabhadra (Bodhisattva)
 Samantapasadika
 Samatha
 Samavati
 Samaya
 Sambhogakaya
 Saṃjñā
 Sammādiṭṭhi Sutta
 Sampajañña
 Samsara (Buddhism)
 Samu Sunim
 Saṃvega
 Samvriti
 Samyak
 Samye
 Samyutta Nikaya
 Sanam Luang Dhamma Studies
 Śāṇavāsa
 Sanchi
 Sandakada pahana
 Sandamuni Pagoda
 Sand mandala
 Sand pagoda
 Sangati
 Sangha
 Sanghamitta
 Sanghapala
 Sangharaj Nikaya
 Sangharaja
 Sangharakshita
 Sangharama
 Sangha Supreme Council
 Sanghata Sutra
 Sangitiparyaya
 Sangrai festival in Bangladesh
 Sankassa
 
 Sanlun
 Sañña
 Sanskrit
 Santacittārāma
 Śāntarakṣita
 Santi Asoke
 Sanzen
 Saptparni cave
 Saraha
 Sariputta
 Sariputta in the Jatakas
 Śarīra
 Sarnath
 Sarvastivada
 Sati
 Satipatthana
 Satipatthana Sutta
 Satori
 Satuditha
 Sautrāntika
 Savatthi
 Sāvaka
 Sāvakabuddha
 Satta sambojjhaṅgā
 Sautrantaka
 Sawlumin inscription
 Sayadaw
 Sayadaw U Narada
 Sayadaw U Pandita
 Sayadaw U Paññāvaṃsa
 Sayadaw U Rewata Dhamma
 Sayadaw U Tejaniya
 Schools of Buddhism
 Buddhism and science
 Secular Buddhism
 Seema Malaka
 Sela Cetiya
 Sengyou
 Sense bases
 Sensei
 Sentience
 Seon
 Seongcheol
 Sesshin
 Sesshū Tōyō
 Sesson Yūbai
 Seto Machindranath
 Seung Sahn
 Seven Factors of Enlightenment
 Shabdrung
 Shakyamuni
 Shamarpa
 Shambhala
 Shambhala Buddhism
 Shambhala Training
 Shangpa Kagyu
 Shanti Stupa, Ladakh
 Shantideva
 Shaolin Monastery
 Shakyo
 Sheng-yen
 Shichidō garan
 Shikantaza
 Shin Arahan
 Shinbyu
 Shin Mahasilavamsa
 Shin Raṭṭhasāra
 Shin Upagutta
 Shin Uttarajiva
 Shinbutsu bunri
 Shinbutsu kakuri
 Shinbutsu-shūgō
 Shingon
 Shinran
 Shite-thaung Temple
 Shivneri Caves
 Shodo Harada
 Shraddha TV
 Shravakayana
 Shravasti
 Shukongōshin
 Shunryu Suzuki
 Shurangama Mantra
 Shurangama Sutra
 Shwedagon Pagoda
 Shwegugyi Temple
 Shwegyin Nikaya
 Shweinbin Monastery
 Shwe Indein Pagoda
 Shwemawdaw Pagoda
 Shwemokhtaw Pagoda
 Shwenandaw Monastery
 Shwesandaw Pagoda (Bagan)
 Shwesandaw Pagoda (Pyay)
 Shwesandaw Pagoda (Twante)
 Shwethalyaung Hill
 Shwethalyaung Pagoda
 Shwe Yin Myaw Pagoda
 Shwezedi Monastery
 Shwezigon Pagoda
 Shwezigon Pagoda Bell Inscription
 Siam Nikaya
 Asgiri Maha Viharaya
 Malwathu Maha Viharaya
 Sibi Jataka
 Siddhartha Gautama
 Sigalovada Sutta
 Sikhī Buddha
 Sikkim Mahinda Thero
 Śīla
 Silk Road transmission of Buddhism
 Silver Pagoda, Phnom Penh
 Similarities between Pyrrhonism and Buddhism
 Simsapa tree
 Sitagu Sayadaw
 Sitatapatra
 Sithulpawwa Rajamaha Viharaya
 Sīvali
 Six heretical teachers
 Six realms
 Sixteen Arhats
 Six yogas of Naropa
 Skanda (Buddhism)
 Skandha
 Smot (chanting)
 Sobin Yamada
 Soen Nakagawa
 Soeng Hyang
 Sōka Gakkai
 Soko Morinaga
 Solosmasthana
 Somawathiya Chaitya
 Somdej Toh
 Somdet Kiaw
 Songtsän Gampo
 Sotāpanna
 Sōtō Zen
 Soto Zen Buddhist Association
 Southern, Eastern and Northern Buddhism
 Soyen Shaku
 Soyu Matsuoka
 Sravaka
 Sri Kalyani Yogasrama Samstha
 Sri Maha Bodhi
 Sri Lankan Forest Tradition
 Sri Piyaratana Tissa Mahanayake Thero
 Sri Singha
 Sri Sumangala College
 Standing Buddha
 State Pariyatti Sasana University, Mandalay
 State Pariyatti Sasana University, Yangon
 State Sangha Maha Nayaka Committee
 Sthavira nikāya
 Store consciousness
 Stream-enterer
 Buddhist Studies
 Stupa
 Stupas in Sri Lanka
 Subcommentaries, Theravada
 Subhuti
 Sudarshan Mahasthavir
 Suddhananda Mahathero
 Suddhipanthaka
 Suddhodana
 Suffering
 Sujata Stupa
 Sujin Boriharnwanaket
 Sukha
 Sukhavati
 Sukhothai Historical Park
 Sulamani Temple 
 Sule Pagoda
 Sumeru
 Sunita
 Sunlun Sayadaw
 Suññatā
 Supernormal powers
 Supreme Patriarch of Cambodia
 Supreme Patriarch of Thailand
 7th Supreme Patriarch of Thailand
 8th Supreme Patriarch of Thailand
 9th Supreme Patriarch of Thailand
 10th Supreme Patriarch of Thailand
 16th Supreme Patriarch of Thailand
 17th Supreme Patriarch of Thailand
 18th Supreme Patriarch of Thailand
 19th Supreme Patriarch of Thailand
 20th Supreme Patriarch of Thailand
 Supushpachandra
 Suramgamasamadhi sutra
 Suryaprabha
 Sutra
 Sutra of Forty-two Chapters
 Sutra of The Great Vows of Ksitigarbha Bodhisattva
 Sutta Nipata
 Sutta Pitaka
 Suttavibhanga
 D. T. Suzuki
 Svabhava
 Svatantrika
 Swayambhunath
 Syama Jataka
 Symbolism
 Sympathetic joy

T

 Tagundaing
 Taiktaw Monastery
 Taisen Deshimaru
 Taisho Tripitaka
 Taixu
 Taizan Maezumi
 Tamote Shinpin Shwegugyi Temple
 Tak Bat Devo
 Takuan Sōhō
 Tanaka Chigaku
 Taṇhā
 Taṇhaṅkara Buddha
 Tantkyitaung Pagoda
 Tantra
 Tantric sex
 Tarka sastra
 Trapusa and Bahalika
 Tara (Buddhism)
 Taranatha
 John Tarrant (Zen Buddhist)
 Tathāgata
 Tathagatagarbha doctrine
 Tathagatagarbha Sutra
 Tathālokā Bhikkhunī
 Tathātā/Dharmatā
 Taung Galay Sayadaw
 Taunggwin Sayadaw
 Taung Kalat
 Tawagu Pagoda
 Taxila
 Tazaungdaing Festival
 Temple of the Tooth
 Tendai
 Tengyur
 Ten Fetters
 Ten Perfections
 Tep Vong
 Ten Principal Disciples
 Ten spiritual realms
 Ten Stages Sutra
 Tenzin Gyatso
 Terma
 Terton
 Thai Buddhist sculpture
 Thai Forest Tradition
 Thai temple art and architecture
 Thadingyut Festival
 Thagyamin
 Thamanya Sayadaw
 Thangka
 Thanissaro Bhikkhu
 Thatbyinnyu Temple
 Thathanabaing of Burma
 That Luang Festival
 Thayettaw Monastery
 The Buddha and His Dhamma
 The Buddhist (TV channel)
 Theragatha
 Theravada
 Therigatha
 The Twin Miracle
 Thích Ca Phật Đài
 Thich Nhat Hanh
 Thiên Ân
 Thilashin
 Thirteen Buddhas
 Thirty-Five Confession Buddhas
 Three Ages of Buddhism
 Threefold Training
 Three Jewels
 Three Jewel Temples of Korea
 Three marks of existence
 Three poisons (Buddhism)
 Three Roots
 Three spheres
 Three types of Buddha
 Three Vajras
 Thubten Chodron
 Thubten Yeshe
 Thubten Zopa Rinpoche
 Thudhamma Nikaya
 Thuparamaya
 Tiantai
 Tibetan art
 Tibetan Buddhism
 Tibetan Buddhist architecture
 Tibetan Buddhist canon
 Tibetan calendar
 Tibetan people
 Sub-commentaries (Theravāda)
 Tiloka
 Trailokyavijaya
 Tilopa
 Timeline of Buddhism
 Tipitaka
 Tipiṭakadhara Dhammabhaṇḍāgārika
 Tipitakadhara Tipitakakovida Selection Examinations
 Tisarana
 Ti-Sarana Buddhist Association
 Tissamaharama Raja Maha Vihara
 Tittha Sutta
 Tonglen
 Torma
 Tranquillity
 Transfer of merit
 Trapusa and Bahalika
 Trāyastriṃśa
 Tricivara
 Tricycle: The Buddhist Review
 Tricycle Foundation
 Trijang Lobsang Yeshe Tenzin Gyatso
 Tripitaka Koreana
 Tripiṭaka tablets at Kuthodaw Pagoda
 Triple Gem
 Triratana
 Trisula
 Trayastrimsa
 Trikaya
 Tsechu
 Je Tsongkhapa
 Tsurphu Monastery
 Tulku
 Tulku Urgyen Rinpoche
 Tusita
 Twenty-two vows of Ambedkar
 Twelve Auspicious Rites
 Twelve Nidanas
 Two Truths Doctrine
 Types of Buddha

U

 U Ba Khin
 Ubon Ratchathani Candle Festival
 Udāna
 Udanavarga
 Udumbara (Buddhism)
 Uisang
 U Khandi
 Ullambana Sutra
 U Nārada
 Unitarian Universalist Buddhist Fellowship
 U Ottama
 Upadana
 Upajjhatthana Sutta
 Upali
 Upali Thera
 U Pannya Jota Mahathera
 Upāsaka
 Upasampada
 Upaya
 Upekkha
 Uposatha
 Uppalavanna
 Uppatasanti Pagoda
 Urna
 Ushnisha
 U Thuzana
 Uttarasanga
 U Vimala
 U Wisara

V

 Vaibhāṣika
 Vairochana
 Vaiśravaṇa
 Vajira (Buddhist nun)
 Sister Vajira
 Vajra
 Vajradhara
 Vajrapani
 Vajrasana, Bodh Gaya
 Vajrasattva
 Vajrayana
 Vajrayogini
 Varanasi
 Vassa
 Vasubandhu
 Vasudhara
 Vatadage
 Vatsīputrīya
 Vedanā
 Buddhist vegetarianism
 Velukandakiya
 Vemacitrin
 Vesak
 Vesali
 Vessantara Festival
 Vessantara Jātaka
 Vibhajjavada
 Vibhanga
 Vicara
 Vidyalankara Pirivena
 Vidyodaya Pirivena
 View
 Vihāra
 Vihara Buddhagaya Watugong
 Vijnanakaya
 Vimalakirti Sutra
 Vīmaṃsaka Sutta
 Vimanavatthu
 Vimuttimagga
 Vinaya
 Vinaya Pitaka
 
 Vipaka
 Vipassana
 Vipassana Meditation Centre
 Vipassana movement
 Vipassanā-ñāṇa
 Virūḍhaka
 Virūpākṣa
 Vīrya
 Visakha
 Visakha Vidyalaya
 Visuddhimagga
 Vitakka
 Vitakkasaṇṭhāna Sutta

W

 Walpola Rahula Thero
 Wan Ok Phansa
 Wang ocheonchukguk jeon
 Brad Warner
 Wat
 Wat Ananda Metyarama Thai Buddhist Temple
 Wat Ananda Youth
 Wat Aranyawiwake
 Wat Arun Ratchawararam
 Wat Bowonniwet Vihara
 Wat Buddhapadipa
 Wat Buppharam, Chiang Mai
 Wat Buppharam, Penang
 Wat Buppharam, Trat
 Wat Chayamangkalaram
 Wat Chedi Liam
 Wat Chedi Luang
 Wat Chetawan
 Wat Mai Suwannaphumaham
 Wat Manorom
 Wat Nong Pah Pong
 Wat Pah Nanachat
 Wat Paknam Bhasicharoen
 Wat Pa Maha Chedi Kaew
 Wat Phnom
 Wat Phra Dhammakaya
 Wat Phra Kaeo Don Tao
 Wat Phra Kaew
 Wat Phra Kaew, Chiang Rai
 Wat Phra Mahathat
 Wat Phra Phutthabat
 Wat Phra Singh
 Wat Phra Si Rattana Mahathat
 Wat Phra Si Sanphet
 Wat Phrathat Doi Suthep
 Wat Phra That Hariphunchai
 Wat Phra That Phanom
 Wat Ratchapradit
 Wat Suan Dok
 Wat Suthat
 Wat Vihear Suor
 Wat Xieng Thong
 Wat Yai Chai Mongkhon
 Alan Watts
 Webu Sayadaw
 Weligama Sri Sumangala
 Weliwita Sri Saranankara Thero
 What the Buddha Taught
 White Horse Temple
 Wisdom
 Wisdom King
 Womb Realm
 Women in Buddhism
 Won Buddhism
 Woncheuk
 Wonhyo
 Wooden fish
 Woodenfish Foundation
 World Fellowship of Buddhists
 World Peace Pagoda, Lumbini
 Wrathful deity
 Wumen Huikai
 Mount Wutai

X
 Xuanzang

Y

 Yagirala Pannananda
 Yaksha
 Yakushi
 Yamabushi
 Yamada Koun
 Yamaka
 Yana
 Yan Aung Myin Shwe Lett Hla Pagoda
 Yasodharā
 Yatala Vehera
 Yaw Mingyi Monastery
 Yazawin Kyaw
 Ye Dharma Hetu
 Ye Le Pagoda
 Yeshe Dorje
 Yeshe Losal
 Yeshe Tsogyal
 Yeshe Walmo
 Yidam
 Yifa
 Yin Shun
 Yinyuan Longqi
 Yoga
 Yogacara
 Young Buddhist Association
 Young Men's Buddhist Association
 Young Men's Buddhist Association (Burma)
 Yuanfen
 Yungang Grottoes
 Yunmen Wenyan
 Yuquan Shenxiu

Z

 Zafu
 Zambala
 Zayat
 Zazen
 Zen
 Zen center
 Zen Centre
 Zendo
 Zen master
 Zenkei Shibayama
 Zenshuji Soto Mission
 Zen Studies Society
 Zhang Zhung culture
 Zhaocheng Jin Tripitaka
 Zhaozhou Congshen
 Zhiyi
 Zhuan Dao
 Zinkyaik Pagoda
 Zongmi

See also
 Buddhism
 Outline of Buddhism
 Buddhist terms and concepts
 List of Buddhists
 List of Buddhist temples

 
Buddhism